Bledius fenyesi is a species of insect in the subfamily Oxytelinae (spiny-legged rove beetles) and in the family Staphylinidae. It is found in Central America and North America.

References

Further reading

 

Oxytelinae
Articles created by Qbugbot
Beetles described in 1911